2 in a Room was an American hip hop, freestyle and hip house duo. The group, active between 1987 and 1995, consisted of rapper Rafael "Dose" Vargas and producer/remixer Roger "Rog Nice" Pauletta.

Musical career
They are best known for their 1990 hit single "Wiggle It", written and produced by George Morel and Rafael Vargas. It spent two weeks at number one on the US Hot Dance Club Play chart and number three on the UK Singles Chart,) and then crossed over to mainstream radio, and climbed to number 15 on the Billboard Hot 100, eventually becoming a gold single. In early 1991 they released the album Wiggle It that Andrew Martin in Q Magazine called intelligent, modern hot-making". 

Before that, they were known for a track called "Do What You Want" (1990) that got a lot of club and DJ play in New York and Chicago. "El Trago (The Drink)" was a number 86 Billboard Hot 100 chart entry (the last of their pop hits), but they did chart several more singles on the dance chart through the 1990s. Their first release in the UK was "Somebody in the House Say Yeah!" in the late part of 1989. They later changed their name to Fulanito; and style of music to merengue. Vargas, also known under Dose Material, was also member of 740 Boyz from 1991.

Discography

Albums

Singles

In popular culture
In 1991, Alvin and the Chipmunks covered "Wiggle It" for their album The Chipmunks Rock the House.

See also
List of number-one dance hits (United States)
List of artists who reached number one on the US Dance chart

References

External links

2 In A Room at Discogs

American dance music groups
American house music groups
American musical duos
Charisma Records artists
Electronic music groups from New York (state)
Hip hop duos
Hip hop groups from New York City
Hip house music groups
Musical groups from New York City
Musical groups established in 1987
Musical groups disestablished in 1995
American rappers of Dominican Republic descent
East Coast hip hop groups
1990 establishments in New York City